Jaan Künnap (born 9 February 1948, in Kõue) is an Estonian mountaineer, photographer, and sports coach.

Biography 

Künnap went to school in Kose, as well as in Tallinn, where he has lived since 1969.

In 1971–1994 he worked as a deep-sea diver on a rescue ship. During this time he logged over 3,000 hours of diving time and recorded depths of up to 80 m.

Mountaineering 
He has climbed to the peak of over 150 mountains. Künnap received the Snow Leopard award in 1987. In 1999, a film was made about him with the same name (Lumeleopard; 1999). He was the president of the Tallinn Alpinism Club between 1983 and 1988 and since 1999 he has led the mountaineering club that bears his name.

First Ascent of 6,000 meters 
In 1982, he took part in an expedition to the Tanõmas mountain range in central Pamiri to celebrate the 350th anniversary of the University of Tartu. In the course of this, the highest unconquered mountain of the Soviet Union at that time was first conquered (the name of the University of Tartu was 350 and the height of the peak was thought to be 6350 m). The expedition was led by Kalev Muru and six climbers reached the top, including Jaan Künnap (ascension leader). 

In 1984,the Estonians again visited the Pamiri to conquer the peaks. At an altitude of 6047 meters, the top was climbed by three groups on different routes. The ascension group, led by Jaan Künnap, reached its peak on August 18 (the day before, the group led by Ilmar Priimetsa reached the top). The peak was called the Tallinn Peak.

He has climbed to the top of several seven-thousanders (and in the case of some of them, like Ismoil Somoni Peak, he has successfully summited several times). He has technically climbed over 8,000 m; however, he has not successfully reached the summit of an eight-thousander. During his climb of Cho Oyu, the eight-thousander he has climbed, he went above 8,000 m, but started coming down before reaching the top.

Künnap has participated in over 50 photography exhibitions and has reached the podium in numerous photography competitions. He has written two books and served as a camera operator for several documentaries. Since 1998, he has worked as a photographer for the Tallinn City Museum. He has also added thousands of photos to Wikimedia Commons and was selected as the best Wikiphotograper of the Year 2019 & 2020 in Estonia.

Awards 
In 1987, he received the Snow Leopard award together with Kalev Muru and Alfred Lõhmus.

In 2001, he was honored with the 3rd class of the Order of the Estonian Red Cross.

Works

Photos

Books 
 Matkaspordi käsiraamat, Jaan Künnapi Alpinismiklubi, 2004. 
 Fotograafia minu elus = Photography in my life, Jaan Künnapi Alpinismiklubi, 2013. 
 Sõlmed ja pleisid, 2016.

References

External links 

 

Estonian mountain climbers
Estonian photographers
1948 births
People from Kose Parish
Living people